Malik Mohammed Hassan (born 14 May 1947) is a leader of the Indian National Congress and a former Minister in the Government of Kerala and also former president of Kerala Pradesh Congress Committee (KPCC) . He has served the Kerala Legislative Assembly for over two decades as part of the Indian National Congress. Being a strong orator and a respected parliamentarian recognised among his peers for his integrity and an inspirational leader accepted by the public, he has always been considered as a true leader who upheld the concept of secularism and nationalism.

Mr. Hassan is currently serving as the UDF Convenor. He was elected to the Kerala Legislative Assembly 5 times, twice from the Kazhakootam constituency (1980-1982 and 1982–1987) and twice from Trivandrum West (1987-1991 and 1991–1996). In 2001, he also represented the Kayamkulam constituency in the Kerala Legislative Assembly. He served as the Minister for Information and Parliamentary Affairs in the Ministry headed by A.K. Antony from 2001 to 2004.

Mr. Hassan is notable for his initiatives such as the NORKA Roots started in 2002 and the Janasree Sustainable Development Mission started in 2009. On 25 March 2017 he was elected as the president of the Kerala Pradesh Congress Committee, and served until 18 September 2018.

Mr. Hassan is also the Founding Director of Jai Hind TV Channel which played a key role in INC Communication Strategy.

Biography 
Hassan was born on 14 May 1947 in Thiruvananthapuram. He was introduced to active politics through the Kerala Students Union (KSU) and became its state president. He was then elected as the senate member and Chairman of the Kerala University Union.

He was elected from the Kazhakootam constituency to the Kerala Legislative Assembly in the 1980 and 1982 elections, and re-elected from Trivandrum West in the 1987 and 1991 general elections. In 2001, he represented the Kayamkulam constituency in the Kerala Legislative Assembly and served as the Minister for Information and Parliamentary Affairs in the Ministry headed by A. K. Antony from 2001 to 2004. He also held the portfolio of Minister for Non-Resident Keralites' Affairs in the Kerala Legislative Assembly.

On 25 March 2017 he became president of the Kerala Pradesh Congress Committee, and served until 18 September 2018.

He is an LLB degree holder.

Early life and education 
In his school days, Hassan was one of the most active members of Akhila Kerala BalaJana Sakhyam, one of the biggest Children's organizations in Asia conducted by Malayala Manorama, where he was elected as the ‘League of Petty Officers’. This was the point where Hassan realised his leadership and mentoring abilities and he was able to formulate opinions and views about society. With the confidence that he gained over time and with his innate oratory skills, Hassan became a prominent member of KSU in college and was elected as the Kerala Student Union President and later became the University Union Chairman. In 1969, during EMS ministry, he was elected as a Student Representative to the Senate in Kerala University. That was a first-time in Asia and he was one among the first 3 members. Mr Hassan's integrity and commitment paved the way in becoming the President of KSU and later Youth Congress State Secretary, in a very short span of time. In 1980, after completing his education, he was elected as Kazhakootam Constituency MLA and was also the District Congress President in Trivandrum. Later, in 2017 Mr. Hassan became the KPCC President. Hassan was born on 14 May 1947 in Thiruvananthapuram. He is married to Rahia A.K and has a daughter Nisha Safeer.

Key Initiatives

NORKA-Roots 
In 2002, during the A.K Ministry, as per the Companies Act, under the leadership of Mr. Hassan, Non-Resident Keralite Affair (NORKA) Roots was implemented under the Kerala Government - a forum that helps to redress all the grievances of Non-Resident Keralites, to safeguard their welfare and also to rehabilitate the returnees from the middle-east and other countries. This agency acted as an interface between the Kerala government and the expatriates. Through NORKA, all the processes and procedures got streamlined for the Immigrants. All attestation processes which was initially done by the Ministry of External Affairs (MEA), Delhi, later came under the NORKA department. The Loka Kerala Sabha (LKS) was also formulated later, an event hosted every two years under NORKA to bring all the Keralites living across the globe under a common platform. This event aims at attracting the Non-Residents of Kerala to invest back in their homeland and thereby leading to the overall economic development of Kerala.

Legal Aid for Gulf-Malayalis through NORKA 
Mr. Hassan is someone who knows to communicate his ideas and values openly to his public which helps create an atmosphere of certainty and trust. He has always visualised what the common-man needed and was proficient enough to provide them with productive results. It was under the guidance of Mr. Hassan that the Malayalis who were stranded in the Gulf jails even after their term, were provided with legal aid. Also, all illegal recruitments were regulated with the help of a discrete police wing that was formed. Through a phone-in-programme that he organised on Asianet called ‘Pravasi Karya Manthriyodu Samsarikkan’ (Speak to external affairs minister), all the grievances were addressed. Mr Hassan always advised his viewers of their right to lodge complaints or notify them against any issues that they faced in the Gulf. This was a big relief and it gladdened the hearts of thousands of Gulf expats then.

Pravasi Bharathiya Diwas 
Mr. Hassan played a pivotal role in addressing the 11th Pravasi Bharatiya Diwas held at Kochi in 2013. The key message he spoke that day at the summit was about the contribution of the Gulf Malayalis towards the development of India and on how Gulf expats stimulate the economy for the better.

Janasree Sustainable Development Mission 
The Janasree Sustainable Development Mission, an NGO, was launched in 2006-07 by a group of Congress leaders headed by Mr. M.M Hassan, the sole purpose of which was to reduce unemployment and poverty. The Janasree Mission also takes up social, educational and cultural activities at the regional-level. The Janasree initiative was inaugurated by then Finance Minister Shri P Chidambaram in Kochi. Janasree Sustainable Development Mission initiative was inspired by the Micro Financing Self-help group started by Mohammed Yunus in Bangladesh. The Janasree initiative began with 20 members and grew up to 50,000 plus members throughout Kerala in no time. The primary objective of the initiative was to generate income for micro- organisations and to help build self-reliant individuals in the state. Mr M.M Hassan played a pivotal role in the growth of the Janasree Mission by closely guiding and monitoring the initiatives through his weekly visits and interactions.

Janasree Microfin Limited 
After about two years of successfully running the Janasree Mission, Mr. Hassan along with his peers, introduced the Non-Banking Finance Company (NBFC) named the Janasree Microfin Limited, which works as per the guidelines and directives issued by the Reserve Bank of India. It operates in 14 districts in Kerala, and has 1 committee in each district. The members of the Janasree Mission have the provision to avail loans from this Janasree Microfin, as much as twenty times their share.

Organic Farming Campaign 
The Organic Farming Campaign was done as part of Janasree Mission in order to propagate non-toxic food production and consumer protection for the common-man in the state. All Janasree Mission Volunteers aimed to promote organic vegetable cultivation in their house-premises and other waste lands so as to make Kerala a self-sufficient state in India. A lot of workshops and exhibitions were held as part of this campaign with the leadership of Mr. Hassan. The state government and the central government also provided a lot of support for this, through the scheme ‘Rashtriya Krishi Vikas Yojana (RKVY)’.

Against Alcohol and Drug Abuse 
Through Janasree Mission, Mr. Hassan also aimed at bringing about a positive change in the usage of alcohol and drugs in Kerala. His sole intention to start this campaign was to strengthen the prevention and reduce the uptake of drugs and alcohol among the youth.

Anti-Hartal Act 
Mr. Hassan was always against all unnecessary hartals that happen in Kerala. He initiated this act by sending out a letter to the Chief Minister of Kerala asking to pass the bill to control unnecessary hartals. He made sure that the bill contained provisions to compensate for any loss or damage to vehicles and other materials during a hartal. According to Mr. Hassan, hartal should always be the last resort for any protest.

Positions Held

References

External links
MM Hassan profile

1947 births
Living people
Malayali politicians
Politicians from Thiruvananthapuram
Indian National Congress politicians from Kerala
Kerala MLAs 1980–1982
Kerala MLAs 1982–1987
Kerala MLAs 1987–1991
Kerala MLAs 1991–1996